The On A Mission Tour was the debut concert tour by English recording artist Katy B, in support of her debut album On a Mission. The tour visited venues across the United Kingdom, before culminating with a date in Belgium.

Reception
David Griffins from 4Music gave the tour a positive review, saying, "With only one album's worth of material to draw from, she probably should have trimmed a couple of songs from the setlist, but overall her gig showed strong promise of things to come."
Kim Dawson from the Daily Star also gave the tour a strong review, saying, "Pure vocals and the ability to turn her brilliant first album into a live rave made this a banger from the off. Katy had the crowd transfixed with her girl-next-door chatter and smashing beats."
Mark Worgan from The Upcoming gave the tour 3/5 stars, saying, "Katy B showed just why she has risen so far so fast, yet that she is by no means yet the finished article. Before closing she thanked everyone 'for coming with her on her mission'. She may not have fully accomplished it yet, but on the evidence of this set given time and a few more floor-fillers she will."

Support acts
Ms Dynamite
P Money
Jamie George
Roska
Zinc

Source:

Setlist
Broken Record
Movement
Louder
Easy Please Me
Power on Me
Witches' Brew
Go Away
Disappear
Good Life / Show Me Love
Hard To Get
Why You Always Here
Perfect Stranger
Crossover
Encore:
Katy on a Mission
Lights On

Source:

Tour dates

References

2011 concert tours